Andrew James Allan Ritchie (born December 6, 1958) is a former swimmer who represented Canada at the 1976 Summer Olympics in Montreal, Quebec.  Ritchie competed in the men's 400-metre individual medley, and finished in seventh place in the event final with a time of 4:27.89.He now coaches for his former club Thunder Bay Thunder Bolts.

References

1958 births
Living people
Canadian male medley swimmers
Olympic swimmers of Canada
Sportspeople from Thunder Bay
Swimmers at the 1976 Summer Olympics
Universiade medalists in swimming
Universiade bronze medalists for Canada
Medalists at the 1977 Summer Universiade